Thoughts of a Predicate Felon is the debut studio album by American rapper Tony Yayo. It was released on August 30, 2005 through G-Unit/Interscope Records. Recording sessions took place at Sound One, at Integrated Studios, Sony Music Studios, G Unit Studios, Sound On Sound and Right Track Recording in New York, at 54 Sound in Detroit, at Encore Studios in Los Angeles and at Joi Studios in Atlanta. Production was handled by Focus..., Eminem, Black Jeruz, DJ Khalil, Domingo, Havoc, J. R. Rotem, LT Moe, Megahertz, Punch, Ron Browz, Sam Sneed, Sebb, Studio 44, and Sha Money XL, who also served as co-executive producer. It features guest appearances from fellow G-Unit members 50 Cent, who also served as executive producer, Lloyd Banks, Young Buck, Olivia and Spider Loc, as well as Eminem, Obie Trice, Jagged Edge, Joe and Kokane.

In the United States, the album debuted at number two on both the Billboard 200 and the Top R&B/Hip-Hop Albums charts with 215,000 copies sold in its first week.

The album produced three singles, "So Seductive", "Curious", and "I Know You Don't Love Me", and one promotional single "Drama Setter", as well as three music videos for "So Seductive", "Curious"/"Pimpin'" and "I Know You Don't Love Me" starring G-Unit.

Background
"With 50, he has the notoriety of hit records. I actually wrote 'Seductive' before he wrote 'Candy Shop'. [That's why] you hear him say 'so seductive' [in the 'Candy Shop' intro]. 50, he plays a big part in all our albums. I feel like we can stand on our own cause we're writing all our material," Tony told SOHH.com. "50, he just adds on. I love to hear 50 get on a record. I love the way 50 rides the beat. I did 'Seductive', 50 came on it and I was like, 'I gotta keep him on it' cause it sounds ten times better with him on it."

The album was delayed and highly anticipated, due to Tony Yayo's time in prison.

The songs "So Seductive" and "Live By The Gun" were featured in the 2005 Xbox video game 50 Cent: Bulletproof. Tony Yayo appears in the video game providing his own voice and likeness and is a playable character in arcade mode.

Critical reception

The album received generally positive reviews from music critics. Some critics noted that the album had stellar production but thought that Tony's vocals and lyrics were not up to par. Writing for Rolling Stone, Christian Hoard said: "With the exception of a few complete duds, Felon is a solid stopgap, although it may also mark the moment when designer bullet holes start to go out of fashion".

Track listing 

Notes
 signifies an additional producer.

Sample credits
Track 1 contains recreated dialogue from American Me
Track 2 contains elements from "Los Hombres De Rabia Tambien Lloran" written by Eliseo Zorrilla and performed by Danny Rivera
Track 4 contains elements from "Sara Smile" written by Hall & Oates and performed by Impact
Track 6 contains resung elements from "Mr. Telephone Man" by Ray Parker Jr.
Track 11 contains elements from "Feelings" by Morris Albert
Track 12 contains elements from "Toxic" by Britney Spears and "Tere Mere Beech Mein" written by Laxmikant Kudalkarand, Pyarelal Sharma and Anand Bakshi and performed by Lata Mangeshkar & S. P. Balasubrahmanyam
Track 15 contains elements from "Early Ev'ry Morning" written by Eugene McDaniels and Leon Pendarvis and performed by Roberta Flack

Personnel

Marvin "Tony Yayo" Bernard – main artist
Derick Prosper – vocals & score (track 1), A&R
Dré McKenzie – vocals (track 1)
Curtis "Spider Loc" Williams – vocals (track 3)
Curtis "50 Cent" Jackson – vocals (tracks: 5, 8, 11, 15, 16), executive producer
Marshall "Eminem" Mathers – vocals & producer (track 7), additional producer (track 3), mixing (tracks: 3, 7)
Obie Trice – vocals (track 7)
Christopher "Lloyd Banks" Lloyd – vocals (tracks: 8, 15)
Olivia Longott – vocals (track 8)
Joseph "Joe" Thomas – vocals (track 10)
Jerry "Kokane" Long, Jr. – vocals (track 11)
Jagged Edge – vocals (track 13)
David "Young Buck" Brown – vocals (track 15)
Hailu – backing vocals (track 17)
Kenyatta Beasley – score (track 1)
Carlos "C12" Bess – score & mixing (track 1)
Eric "E Bass" Johnson – bass (track 2)
Luis Resto – additional keyboards (tracks: 3, 7), additional producer (track 7)
Stu "Bassie" Brooks – additional bass (track 5), bass (track 14)
Steven King – guitar & bass (track 7), mixing (tracks: 3, 7)
Jeff Bass – keyboards & additional producer (track 7)
Tony Burgess – guitar & additional producer (track 10)
Domingo Padilla – producer (track 2)
Sébastien "Sebb" Vuignier – producer (track 3)
Robert "Black Jeruz" Smith – producer (track 4)
Michael "Sha Money XL" Clervoix – producer (track 4), co-executive producer
Mike "Punch" Harper – producer (track 5)
Bernard "Focus..." Edwards, Jr. – producer (tracks: 6, 13, 17)
Jonathan "J.R." Rotem – producer (track 8)
Todd "LT Moe" Moore – producer & recording (track 9)
Samuel "Sam Sneed" Anderson – producer (track 10)
DJ Khalil Abdul-Rahman – producer (track 11)
Dorsey "Megahertz" Wesley – producer (track 12)
Rondell "Ron Browz" Turner – producer (track 14)
Studio 44 – producer (track 15)
Kejuan "Havoc" Muchita – producer (track 16)
Steve Simons – recording (track 1)
Ky Miller – recording (tracks: 2–6, 8, 11–17)
Mike Strange – recording (track 7), additional recording (track 3)
Tony Campana – recording (track 7), additional recording (track 3)
Taurus Scott – recording (track 7)
Nicholas "Aqua" McCarrell – recording (track 10)
Pat Viala – recording (tracks: 10, 11), mixing (tracks: 2, 6, 8, 10–13, 15–17)
Wesley Morris – recording (track 13)
Steve Baughman – mixing (tracks: 4, 5, 9, 14)
Mauricio "Veto" Iragorri – mixing (track 4)
Brian "Big Bass" Gardner – mastering
Marcus Heisser – A&R
Jonathan Mannion – photography

Charts

Weekly charts

Year-end charts

References

External links

Tony Yayo albums
2005 debut albums
G-Unit Records albums
Albums produced by Eminem
Interscope Records albums
Albums produced by Focus...
Albums produced by DJ Khalil
Albums produced by Ron Browz
Albums produced by Sam Sneed
Albums produced by J. R. Rotem
Albums produced by Sha Money XL
Albums produced by Havoc (musician)